Upper Browns Tract Pond is located northeast of Inlet, New York. The inlet flows through a creek from Lower Browns Tract Pond. Fish species present in the lake are largemouth bass, black bullhead, yellow perch, and sunfish. There is a carry down in the campground off Browns Tract Pond Road. No motors are allowed on this lake.

References

Lakes of New York (state)
Lakes of Hamilton County, New York